Maria Rafols Matriculation Higher Secondary School is an English medium self-financed school located in Mandaikadu, Kanyakumari District, India. The school was established by the Sisters of Charity of St.Anne in the year 1994 with only I standard. It is also run by the Sisters of Charity of St.Anne. Gradually the school was upgraded to a Higher Secondary School. It is a coeducation Christian minority school, giving preference of admission to Catholic students. However, children of other religions are also admitted.

See also
Bapuji Memorial School
 A.P.J.M. Matriculation Higher Secondary School 
Bethlahem Matric School

References

Catholic schools in India
Christian schools in Tamil Nadu
Primary schools in Tamil Nadu
High schools and secondary schools in Tamil Nadu
Schools in Kanyakumari district
Educational institutions established in 1994
1994 establishments in Tamil Nadu